Sulby Glen Railway Station (Manx: Stashoon Raad Yiarn Ghlion Sulby) was a station on the Manx Northern Railway, later owned and operated by the Isle of Man Railway; it served the village of Sulby in the Isle of Man and was an intermediate stopping place on a line that ran between St. John's and Ramsey.

Layout
As the next stations on both sides were provided with passing loops, this station ran straight through.

Station building

The original station building, built from corrugated iron at the time of opening, was later deemed to be too close to the running line, and was rebuilt at the turn of the 20th century with a different style of building with a built-in canopy, making it unique in style among the  Manx Northern Railway's stations.

Today
The station was closed, along with all other stations on the line, in 1968 and later converted to a private dwelling. The former platform has had a wall added to make another room for the house, but the original structure and purpose can clearly be seen from the nearby footpath that follows the trackbed.  There was also a corrugated hut here as a goods shed/store and this is also still extant.

Route

See also
 Isle of Man Railway stations
 Manx Northern Railway
 Sulby, Isle of Man

References

Railway stations in the Isle of Man
Railway stations opened in 1879
Railway stations closed in 1968
1879 establishments in the Isle of Man
1968 disestablishments in the Isle of Man